Lane P. Hughston (born 24 December 1951 in Corpus Christi, Texas) is an American mathematician.

Early life and education
Lane P. Hughston was born in Corpus Christi, Texas, and raised in Dallas, Texas, where he attended J. J. Pershing Elementary School, Benjamin Franklin Junior High School, and Hillcrest High School. He is the son of Edward Wallace Hughston and Joan Palmer Hughston. He holds a doctorate in mathematics from the University of Oxford, where he was a Rhodes Scholar and a student of  Roger Penrose. While he was a student at Oxford he was based at  Magdalen College.

Career
After obtaining his doctorate he held a Junior Research Fellowship at Wolfson College, Oxford, and then was Fellow and Tutor in Applied Mathematics at Lincoln College, Oxford.

Later, he worked as a financial engineer at Robert Fleming & Co. Limited, London, and at Merrill Lynch, London, and then as professor of financial mathematics at King's College London, as professor of mathematics at Imperial College London, as professor of mathematics at Brunel University and as professor of mathematics at Goldsmiths, University of London.

He has held visiting appointments at the University of Texas at Austin, King's College London, the Institute for Advanced Study, the Perimeter Institute for Theoretical Physics, and University College London.

He has carried out work in general relativity, cosmology, twistor theory, quantum mechanics, statistical mechanics, mathematical finance, and quantum information.

Published works
 L. P. Hughston (1969) Multifluid Cosmologies, Astrophysical Journal, Vol 158, pp 987–989.
 L. P. Hughston & K. C. Jacobs (1970) Homogeneous Electromagnetic and Massive Vector Meson Fields in Bianchi Cosmologies, Astrophysical Journal, Vol 160, pp 147–152.
 L. P. Hughston & L. C. Shepley (1970) Anisotropic Multi-fluid Cosmologies with Hypersurface Orthogonal Velocity Fields, Astrophysical Journal, Vol 160, pp 333–336. 
 L. P. Hughston (1971) Generalized Vaidya Metrics, International Journal of Theoretical Physics, Vol 4 (4), pp 267–271.
 L. P. Hughston, R. Penrose, P. Sommers & M. Walker (1972) On a Quadratic First Integral for the Charged Particle Orbits in the Charged Kerr Solution, Communications in Mathematical Physics, Vol 27 (4) pp 303–308.
 L. P. Hughston (1972) On an Einstein-Maxwell Field with a Null Source, in Methods of Local and Global Differential Geometry in General Relativity  (D. Farnsworth,  J. Fink,  J. Porter & A. Thompson, eds) Lecture Notes in Physics 14, pp 121–125, Springer-Verlag. 
 L. P. Hughston & P. D. Sommers (1973) Spacetimes with Killing Tensors, Communications in Mathematical Physics, Vol 32 (2), pp 147–152.
 L. P. Hughston & P. D. Sommers (1973) The Symmetries of Kerr Black Holes, Communications in Mathematical Physics, Vol 33 (2), 129–133.
 L. P. Hughston (1979) Some New Contour Integral Formulae, in Complex Manifold Techniques in Theoretical Physics (D. Lerner & P. D. Sommers, eds), Pitman, pp 115–125.
 L. P. Hughston (1979) Twistors and Particles, Springer Lecture Notes in Physics 97, Springer-Verlag.  .
 L. P. Hughston & R. S. Ward, eds (1979) Advances in Twistor Theory, Pitman. .
 L. P. Hughston (1980) The Twistor Particle Programme, Surveys in High Energy Physics, Vol 4, 310–332.
 L. P. Hughston & M. C. Sheppard (1980) On the Magnetic Moments of Hadrons, Reports on Mathematical Physics, Vol 18, 55–68.
 L. P. Hughston & T. R. Hurd (1981) A Cohomological Description of Massive Fields, Proc. Roy. Soc. Lond. A, Vol 378, pp 141–154.
 L. P. Hughston (1982) The Relativistic Oscillator, Proc. Roy. Soc. Lond. A, Vol 382, pp 459–466.
 L. P. Hughston & T. R. Hurd (1983) A Manifestly Conformally Covariant CP5 Integral Formula for Massless Fields, Physics Letters B, Vol 124, 362–364.
 L. P. Hughston & T. R. Hurd (1983) A Geometrical Approach to Bose and Fermi Statistics, Physics Letters B, Vol 127, 201–203.
 L. P. Hughston & T. R. Hurd (1983) A CP5 Calculus for Space-Time Fields, Physics Reports, Vol 100, 273–326.
 L. P. Hughston (1984) Why the Apple Falls, Times Higher Educational Supplement, No 620, p iii.
 L. P. Hughston (1985) The Tail of the Lion, Times Higher Educational Supplement, No 667, p 16.
 L. P. Hughston (1986) Entropy, Uncertainty, and Nonlinearity, in Quantum Concepts in Space and Time (C. J. Isham & R. Penrose, eds) Oxford University Press, Chapter 11, pp 174–181.
 L. P. Hughston (1986) Supertwistors and Superstrings, Nature, Vol 321, pp 381–382. 
 L. P. Hughston (1986) Points in Space-Time, Times Higher Educational Supplement, No 715, p 20.
 L. P. Hughston & W. T. Shaw (1987) Real Classical Strings, Proc. Roy. Soc. Lond. A, Vol 414, pp 415–422.
 L. P. Hughston (1987) Applications of SO(8) Spinors, in Gravitation and Geometry: a volume in honour of Ivor Robinson (W. Rindler & A. Trautman, eds) Bibliopolis, Naples, pp 253–277.
 L. P. Hughston & W. T. Shaw (1987) Minimal Curves in Six Dimensions, Classical and Quantum Gravity, Vol 4, pp 869–892.
 L. P. Hughston & W. T. Shaw (1987) Classical Strings in Ten Dimensions, Proc. Roy. Soc. Lond. A, Vol 414}, pp 423–431.
 L. P. Hughston (1987) Remarks on Sommers' Theorem, Classical and Quantum Gravity, Vol 4, pp 1809–1811.
 L. P. Hughston & W. T. Shaw (1988) Constraint Free Analysis of Relativistic Strings, Classical and Quantum Gravity, Vol 5, pp L69-72. 
 L. P. Hughston (1988) Applications of Cartan Spinors to Differential Geometry in Higher Dimensions, in Spinors in Physics and Geometry (A. Trautman & G. Furlan, eds) World Scientific Press, pp 226–237. 
 W. J. Brooks & L. P. Hughston (1988) A Problem in Squash Strategy, The Mathematical Gazette, Vol 72, pp 92–95. 
 L. P. Hughston & L. J. Mason (1988) A Generalized Kerr-Robinson Theorem, Classical and Quantum Gravity, Vol 5, pp 275–285.
 L. P. Hughston & W. T. Shaw (1989) Spinor Parametrisations of Minimal Surfaces, in Mathematics of Surfaces III (D. C. Handscomb, ed) Oxford University Press, pp 359–372.
 L. P. Hughston (1989) So Great an Absurdity, Times Higher Educational Supplement}, No 875, p 19.
 L. P. Hughston (1989) Covered Warrants: Are They Really Covered?, The Treasurer, November issue, pp 32–34.
 L. P. Hughston (1989) Time to Call on Japan's Warrant Idea, International Money Marketing, December issue, p 26.
 L. P. Hughston & W. T. Shaw (1990) Twistors and Strings, in Twistors in Mathematics and Physics (R. Baston & T. N. Bailey, eds) Cambridge University Press, Chapter 12, pp 218–245.
 L. P. Hughston & K. P. Tod (1990) An Introduction to General Relativity, London Mathematical Society Student Texts 5, Cambridge University Press. .
 L. J. Mason & L. P. Hughston, eds (1990) Further Advances in Twistor Theory, Volume I: The Penrose Transform and its Applications, Pitman Research Notes in Mathematics Series 231, Longman Scientific and Technical. .
 L. P. Hughston, R. Jozsa & W. K. Wootters (1993) A Complete Classification of Quantum Ensembles having a Given Density Matrix, Physics Letters A, Vol 183, pp 14–18. 
 B. Flesaker & L. P. Hughston (1993) Contingent Claim Replication in Continuous Time with Transaction Costs. Working paper, Merrill Lynch. Presented at the 29th Conference of the Western Finance Association, Santa Fe, New Mexico, 22 June 1994.
 L. P. Hughston (1993) Financial Geometry: a New Angle on Risk, International Derivative Review, September issue (SunGard Capital Markets), pp 11–14. 
 B. Flesaker, L. P. Hughston, L. Schreiber & L. Sprung (1994) Taking All the Credit, Risk, Vol 7 (9), pp 104–108, reprinted in Yearbook of Fixed Income Investing 1995 (J. D. Finnerty & M. S. Fridson, eds), Irwin Professional Publishing (1996).
 L. P. Hughston (1994) Stochastic Differential Geometry, Financial Modelling, and Arbitrage-Free Pricing. Working paper, Merrill Lynch. Presented at the Cambridge Finance Forum, 4 March 1994.
 L. P. Hughston (1994) Financial Observables, International Derivative Review, December issue (SunGard Capital Markets), pp 11–14.
 L. P. Hughston (1995) Geometric Aspects of Quantum Mechanics, in Twistor Theory (S. A. Huggett, ed) Marcel Dekker, Chapter 6, pp 59–79. 
 L. J. Mason, L. P. Hughston &  P. K. Kobak, eds (1995) Further Advances in Twistor Theory, Volume II: Integrable Systems, Conformal Geometry, and Gravitation, Pitman Research Notes in Mathematics Series 232, Longman Scientific and Technical. .
 B. Flesaker & L. P. Hughston (1996) Positive Interest, Risk, Vol 9 (1), pp 46–49, reprinted in Vasicek and Beyond (L. P. Hughston, ed) Risk Publications (1996), and Hedging with Trees (M. Broadie & P. Glasserman, eds) Risk Publications (1998). 
 L. P. Hughston (1996) Geometry of Stochastic State Vector Reduction, Proc. Roy. Soc. Lond. A, Vol 452, pp 953–979.
 L. P. Hughston, ed (1996) Vasicek and Beyond: Approaches to Building and Applying Interest Rate Models, Risk Publications. .
 D. C. Brody & L. P. Hughston (1996) Geometry of Quantum Statistical Inference, Physical Review Letters, Vol 77, pp 2851–2854. 
 B. Flesaker & L. P. Hughston (1996) Positive Interest: Foreign Exchange, in Vasicek and Beyond (L. P. Hughston, ed) Risk Publications, Chapter 22, pp 351–367. 
 L. P. Hughston (1996) Pricing of Credit Derivatives, IFR Financial Derivatives and Risk Management, Issue 5, pp 11–16.
 D. C. Brody & L. P. Hughston (1997) Generalised Heisenberg Relations for Quantum Statistical Estimation, Physics Letters A, Vol 236, pp 257–262. 
 B. Flesaker & L. P. Hughston (1997) Exotic Interest Rate Options, in Exotic Options: the State of the Art (L. Clewlow & C. Strickland, eds) International Thompson Publishing, Chapter 9, pp 209–227. 
 B. Flesaker & L. P. Hughston (1997) International Models for Interest Rates and Foreign Exchange, Net Exposure, Issue 3, pp 55–79, reprinted in The New Interest Rate Models (L. P. Hughston, ed) Risk Publications (2000), Chapter 13, pp 217–236. 
 B. Flesaker & L. P. Hughston (1997) Dynamic Models of Yield Curve Evolution, in Mathematics of Derivative Securities (M. A. H. Dempster & S. R. Pliska, eds) Cambridge University Press, Chapter 17, pp 294–314. 
 L. P. Hughston (1997) Financial Calculus, Risk, Vol 10 (3), pp 63–64.
 L. P. Hughston (1998) Inflation Derivatives. Working paper, Merrill Lynch and King's College London. 
 D. C. Brody & L. P. Hughston (1998) Geometry of Thermodynamic States, Physics Letters A, Vol 245, 73–78. 
 D. C. Brody & L. P. Hughston (1998) Statistical Geometry in Quantum Mechanics, Proc. Roy. Soc. Lond. A, Vol 454, pp 2445–2475.
 B. Flesaker & L. P. Hughston (1998) Positive Interest: an Afterword, in Hedging with Trees: Advances in Pricing and Risk Managing Derivatives (M. Broadie & P. Glasserman, eds) Risk Publications, pp 120–124. 
 D. C. Brody & L. P. Hughston (1998) The Quantum Canonical Ensemble, Journal of Mathematical Physics, Vol. 39, 6502–6508.
 D. C. Brody & L. P. Hughston (1998) Geometric Models for Quantum Statistical Inference, in The Geometric Universe: Science, Geometry, and the Work of Roger Penrose (S. A. Huggett, L. J. Mason, K. P. Tod, S. T. Tsou & N. M. J. Woodhouse, eds) Oxford University Press, Chapter 18, pp 265–276.
 L. P. Hughston, P. Nurowski & D. Robinson (1999) Extensions of Bundles of Null Directions, Classical and Quantum Gravity, Vol 16, pp 255–279.
 L. P. Hughston, ed (1999) Options: Classic Approaches to Pricing and Modelling, Risk Publications. .
 D. C. Brody & L. P. Hughston (1999) Thermalisation of Quantum States, Journal of Mathematical Physics, Vol 40, pp 12–18.
 P. Balland & L. P. Hughston (1999) The Sticky Delta Model, Derivative Week, Learning Curve, 1 November issue.
 T. R. Field & L. P. Hughston (1999) The Geometry of Coherent States, Journal of Mathematical Physics, Vol 40, pp 2568–2583.
 D. C. Brody & L. P. Hughston (1999) Geometrisation of Statistical Mechanics, Proc. Roy. Soc. Lond. A, Vol 455, pp 1683–1715.
 P. Balland & L. P. Hughston  (2000) Markov Model Consistent with Caplet Smile, International Journal of Theoretical and Applied Finance, Vol 3, pp 161–181.
 L. P. Hughston (2000) Not for the Fainted-Hearted, Risk, Vol 13 (2), p 59. 
 D. C. Brody & L. P. Hughston (2000) The Information Content of a Quantum State, Journal of Mathematical Physics, Vol 41, pp 2586–2592.
 L. P. Hughston & S. M. Turnbull (2000) Credit Derivatives Made Simple, Risk, Vol 13 (10), pp 36–43, reprinted  in Credit Risk Modelling, The Cutting Edge Collection (M. Gordy, ed) Risk Books (2003). Japanese translation (D. C. Brody) in Risk Japan, Vol 1, (1), pp 50–54 (2001).
 L. P. Hughston, ed (2000) The New Interest Rate Models: Recent Developments in the Theory and Application of Yield Curve Dynamics, Risk Publications. .
 D. C. Brody & L. P. Hughston (2001) Interest Rates and Information Geometry, Proc. Roy. Soc. Lond. A, Vol 457, pp 1343–1363.
 L. P. Hughston & S. M. Turnbull (2001) Credit Risk: Constructing the Basic Building Blocks, Economic Notes, Vol 30, pp 281–292.
 D. C. Brody & L. P. Hughston (2001) Geometric Quantum Mechanics, Journal of Geometry and Physics, Vol 38, pp 19–53. 
 P. Sollich, A. Coolen, L. P. Hughston & R. F. Streater, eds (2001) Disordered and Complex Systems, American Institute of Physics. .
 S. A. Adler, D. C. Brody, T. A. Brun & L. P. Hughston (2001) Martingale Models for Quantum State Reduction, Journal of Physics A, Vol 34, pp 8795–8820.
 L. J. Mason, L. P. Hughston,  P. K. Kobak & K. Pulverer, eds (2001) Further Advances in Twistor Theory, Volume III: Curved Twistor Spaces, Research Notes in Mathematics 424, Chapman and Hall/CRC. .
 D. C. Brody & L. P. Hughston (2001) Applications of Information Geometry to Interest Rate Theory, in Disordered and Complex Systems (P. Sollich, A. Coolen, L. P. Hughston & R. F. Streater, eds) AIP Conference Proceedings, Vol 553, pp 281–288.
 L. P. Hughston & M. Zervos (2001) Martingale Approach to the Pricing of Real Options, in Disordered and Complex Systems (P. Sollich, A. Coolen, L. P. Hughston & R. F. Streater, eds) AIP Conference Proceedings, Vol 553, pp 325–330.
 D. C. Brody & L. P. Hughston (2002) Entropy and Information in the Interest Rate Term Structure, Quantitative Finance, Vol 2, pp 70–80.
 L. P. Hughston (2002) Symbolic Meaning for Numbers, GARP Risk Review, Issue 7, p 41.
 D. C. Brody & L. P. Hughston (2002) Efficient Simulation of Quantum State Reduction, Journal of Mathematical Physics, Vol 43, pp 5254–5261.
 D. C. Brody & L. P. Hughston (2002) Stochastic Reduction Models in Nonlinear Quantum Mechanics, Proc. Roy. Soc. Lond. A, Vol 458, pp 1117–1127.
 L. P. Hughston (2003) The Past, Present, and Future of Term Structure Modelling, in Modern Risk Management: a History (P. Field, introduction) Risk Publications, Chapter 7, pp 107–132.
 D. C. Brody, L. P. Hughston & J. Syroka (2003) Relaxation of Quantum States under Energy Perturbations, Proc. Roy. Soc. Lond. A, Vol 459, pp 2297–2316.
 D. C. Brody & L. P. Hughston (2004) Chaos and Coherence: a New Framework for Interest Rate Modelling, Proc. Roy. Soc. Lond. A, Vol 460, pp 85–110.
 L. P. Hughston & A. Rafailidis (2005) A Chaotic Approach to Interest Rate Modelling, Finance and Stochastics, Vol 9, pp 43–65.
 D. C. Brody & L. P. Hughston (2005) Finite-Time Stochastic Reduction Models, Journal of Mathematical Physics, Vol 46, 082101:1-7. 
 D. C. Brody & L. P. Hughston (2005) Theory of Quantum Space-Time, Proc. Roy. Soc. Lond. A, Vol 462, pp 2679–2699.
 D. C. Brody & L. P. Hughston (2005) Twistor Cosmology and Quantum Space-Time, in Fundamental Interactions and Twistor-Like Methods (J. Lukierski & D. Sorokin, eds), AIP Conference Proceedings, Vol 767, pp 57–95.
 D. C. Brody & L. P. Hughston (2006) Quantum Noise and Stochastic Reduction, Journal of Physics A, Vol 39 (4), pp 833–876.
 D. C. Brody, I. C. Constantinou, J. D. C. Dear & L. P. Hughston (2006) Exactly Solvable Quantum State Reduction Models with Time-Dependent Coupling, Journal of Physics A, Vol 39 (35), pp 11029–11051.
 A. L. Bronstein, L. P. Hughston, M. R. Pistorius & M. Zervos (2006) Discretionary Stopping of One-Dimensional Ito Diffusions with a Staircase Reward Function, Journal of Applied Probability, Vol 43, pp 984–996.
 D. C. Brody & L. P. Hughston (2006) Quantum States and Space-Time Causality, in Proceedings of the Second International Symposium on Information Geometry and its Applications, University of Tokyo, Japan.
 D. C. Brody, D. W. Hook & L. P. Hughston (2007) Unitarity, Ergodicity, and Quantum Thermodynamics, Journal of Physics A, Vol 40, 503–509.
 D. C. Brody, D. W. Hook  & L. P. Hughston (2007) On Quantum Microcanonical Equilibrium, Journal of Physics: Conference Series, Vol 67, 012025:1-7.
 D. C. Brody, D. W. Hook & L. P. Hughston (2007) Quantum Phase Transitions without Thermodynamic Limits, Proc. Roy. Soc. Lond. A, Vol 463, pp 2021–2030.
 D. C. Brody, L. P. Hughston & A. Macrina (2007) Beyond Hazard Rates: a New Framework for Credit Risk Modelling, in Advances in Mathematical Finance (M. Fu, R. Jarrow, Ju-Yi Yen &  R. Elliott, eds) Birkhauser, pp 231–257.
 D. C. Brody, A. Gustavsson & L. P. Hughston (2007) Entanglement of Three-Qubit Geometry,  Journal of Physics: Conference Series, Vol 67, 012044:1-6.
 D. C. Brody, L. P. Hughston & A. Macrina (2008) Information-Based Asset Pricing, International Journal of Theoretical and Applied Finance, Vol 11 (1), pp 107–142.
 L. P. Hughston & A. Macrina (2008) Information, Inflation, and Interest, in Advances in Mathematics of Finance (L. Stettner, ed), Banach Center Publications, Vol 83, pp 117–138.
 D. C. Brody, A. Gustavsson & L. P. Hughston (2008) Symplectic Approach to Quantum Constraints, Journal of Physics A, Vol 41, 475301.
 D. C. Brody, L. P. Hughston & A. Macrina (2008) Dam Rain and Cumulative Gain, Proc. Roy. Soc. Lond. A, Vol 464, pp 1801–1822.
 D. C. Brody, A. Gustavsson & L. P. Hughston (2009) Metric Approach to Quantum Constraints, Journal of Physics A, Vol 42, 295303.
 D. C. Brody, M. H. A. Davis, R. L. Friedman & L. P. Hughston (2009) Informed Traders, Proc. Roy. Soc. Lond. A, Vol 465, pp 1103–1122.
 D. C. Brody, A. Gustavsson & L. P. Hughston (2010) Nonlinearity and Constrained Quantum Motion, Journal of Physics A, Vol 43, 082003.
 D. C. Brody, L. P. Hughston & M. Parry (2010) Effects of Quantum Entanglement in Phase Transitions, Physics Letters A, Vol 374, pp 2424–2428.
 D. C. Brody, L. P. Hughston & A. Macrina (2010) Credit Risk, Market Sentiment and Randomly-Timed Default, in Stochastic Analysis in 2010 (D. Crisan, ed) Springer-Verlag, pp 267–280.
 L. P. Hughston & A. Macrina (2010) Discrete-Time Interest-Rate Modelling, in Progress in Analysis and its Applications (M. Ruzhansky & J. Wirth, eds), World Scientific Publishing Company.
 E. Hoyle, L. P. Hughston & A. Macrina (2011) Lévy Random Bridges and the Modelling of Financial Information, Stochastic Processes and their Applications, Vol 121, pp 856–884.
 D. C. Brody, L. P. Hughston & A. Macrina (2011) Modelling Information Flows in Financial Markets, in Advanced Mathematical Methods for Finance, (G. Di Nunno & B. Oksendal, eds), Springer-Verlag, Chapter 5, pp 133–153.
 L. P. Hughston & F. Mina (2012) On the Representation of General Interest Rate Models as Square-Integrable Wiener Functionals, in Recent Advances in Financial Engineering 2011 (Y. Muromachi, H. Nakaoka & A. Takahashi, eds) World Scientific Publishing Company, pp 1–20.
 L. P. Hughston & A. Macrina (2012) Pricing Fixed-Income Securities in an Information-Based Framework, Applied Mathematical Finance, Vol 19 (4), pp 361–379.
 D. C. Brody, L. P. Hughston & E. Mackie (2012) Rational Term Structure Models with Geometric Lévy Martingales, Stochastics, Vol 84, 719–740. 
 D. Filipovic, L. P. Hughston & A. Macrina (2012) Conditional Density Models for Asset Pricing, International Journal of Theoretical and Applied Finance, Vol 15 (1), 1250002:1-24. 
 D. C. Brody, L. P. Hughston & E. Mackie (2012) General Theory of Geometric Lévy Models for Dynamic Asset Pricing, Proc. Roy. Soc. Lond. A, Vol 468, pp 1778–1798. 
 M. R. Grasselli & L. P. Hughston, eds (2013) Finance at Fields, World Scientific Publishing Company. .
 D. C. Brody & L. P. Hughston (2013) Lévy Information and the Aggregation of Risk Aversion, Proc. Roy. Soc. Lond. A, Vol 469, 20130024:1-19.
 D. C. Brody, L. P. Hughston & X. Yang (2013) Signal Processing with Lévy Information, Proc. Roy. Soc. Lond. A, Vol 469, 20120433. 
 L. P. Hughston (2014) Foreword, in Quant of the Year 2000-2014: All the Award-Winning Papers (A. Lipton, ed) Risk Books, pp xvii-xviii.
 D. C. Brody & L. P. Hughston (2015) Universal Quantum Measurements, Journal of Physics: Conference Series, Vol 624, 012002:1-13.
 E. Hoyle, L. P. Hughston & A. Macrina (2015) Stable-1/2 Bridges and Insurance, in Advances in Mathematics of Finance (A. Palczewski & L. Stettner, eds), Banach Center Publications, Vol 104, pp 95–120.
 D. C. Brody, L. P. Hughston & D. M. Meier (2015) Fragile Entanglement Statistics, Journal of Physics A, Vol 48, 425301:1-15. 
 C. M. Bender, D. C. Brody, L. P. Hughston & B. K. Meister (2016) Geometric Aspects of Space-Time Reflection Symmetry in Quantum Mechanics, in Non-Hermitian Hamiltonians in Quantum Physics (F. Bagarello, R. Passante & C. Trapani, eds), Springer Proceedings in Physics, Vol 184, pp 185–199.
 D. C. Brody & L. P. Hughston (2016) Thermodynamics of Quantum Heat Bath,  Journal of Physics A, Vol 49, 425302:1-25.
 L. P. Hughston & S. M. Salamon (2016) Surveying Points in the Complex Projective Plane, Advances in Mathematics, Vol 286, pp 1017–1052.
 D. C. Brody & L. P. Hughston (2018) Social Discounting and the Long Rate of Interest, Mathematical Finance, Vol 28, pp 306–334.
 D. C. Brody, L. P. Hughston & D. M. Meier (2018) Lévy-Vasicek Models and the Long-Bond Return Process, International Journal of Theoretical and Applied Finance, Vol 21 (3), 1850026:1-26.
 D. C. Brody & L. P. Hughston  (2018) Quantum State Reduction, in Collapse of the Wave Function: Models, Ontology, Origin, and Implications (S. Gao, ed), Cambridge University Press, pp 47–74.
 G. Bouzianis & L. P. Hughston (2019) Determination of the Lévy Exponent in Asset Pricing Models, International Journal of Theoretical and Applied Finance, Vol 22 (1), 1850008:1-18.
 D. C. Brody, L. P. Hughston & B. K. Meister (2020) Theory of Cryptocurrency Interest Rates, SIAM Journal on Financial Mathematics, Vol 11 (1), pp 148–168.
 L. P. Hughston & L. Sánchez-Betancourt (2020) Pricing with Variance Gamma Information, Risks, Vol 8 (4), 105:1-22.  https://doi.org/10.3390/risks8040105.
 G. Bouzianis & L. P. Hughston (2020) Optimal Hedging in Incomplete Markets, Applied Mathematical Finance, Vol 27 (4), pp 265–287.
 G. Bouzianis, L. P. Hughston, S. Jaimungal &  L. Sánchez-Betancourt (2021) Lévy-Ito Models in Finance, Probability Surveys, Vol 18, pp 132–178.
 D. C. Brody & L. P. Hughston (2021) Quantum Measurement of Space-Time Events,  Journal of Physics A, Vol 54, 235304:1-20. https://doi.org/10.1088/1751-8121/abfac6.
 D. C. Brody, L. P. Hughston & A. Macrina, eds (2022) Financial Informatics: An Information-Based Approach to Asset Pricing, World Scientific Publishing Company. 
 D. C. Brody, L. P. Hughston & X. Yang (2022) On the Pricing of Storable Commodities, in Financial Informatics: An Information-Based Approach to Asset Pricing (D. C. Brody, L. P. Hughston & A. Macrina, eds), World Scientific Publishing Company.
 D. C. Brody & L. P. Hughston (2023) Lévy Models for Collapse of the Wave Function,  Journal of Physics A, Vol 56, 125303:1-27. https://doi.org/10.1088/1751-8121/acbe7f.

See also
Schrödinger–HJW theorem

References

20th-century American mathematicians
21st-century American mathematicians
Alumni of Magdalen College, Oxford
American Rhodes Scholars
People from Dallas
Living people
1951 births
Academics of King's College London
Hillcrest High School (Dallas) alumni